Death of a Gentleman is a 2015 documentary film about the takeover of the governance of cricket by ICC's 'Big Three'. It was directed by Sam Collins, Jarrod Kimber and Johnny Blank, and features interviews with takeover architects Giles Clarke and N Srinivasan (the other was Wally Edwards), alongside Ed Cowan, Tony Greig,  Gideon Haigh, Michael Holding, Jonathan Agnew, Chris Gayle, Rev. Andrew Wingfield Digby, Haroon Lorgat, Lalit Modi, and Kevin Pietersen.

Plot
It details the allegation that the Cricket Australia (CA), England and Wales Cricket Board (ECB), and Board of Control for Cricket in India (BCCI) have taken over running of cricket for their own financial gain, at the expense of other Test member countries and especially the associate countries seeking Test status.

Release
It premiered at the Sheffield Doc/Fest in June 2015.

Awards 
It was recognised as the Television Sports Documentary of the Year at the prestigious Sports Journalists' Awards in London in 2016. It beat off a strong shortlist including the highly commended Catch Me If You Can (a BBC Panorama investigation into allegations of doping in athletics), and One Day in May (BT Sport's story of the Bradford City fire).

References

External links
Official website
Change Cricket petition (archived 2016)

Review of film at The Guardian

2015 films
2015 documentary films
Cricket films
2010s English-language films
British sports documentary films
2010s British films